The Kennedy Professorship of Latin is the senior professorship of Latin at the University of Cambridge.

In 1865, when Benjamin Hall Kennedy retired as headmaster of Shrewsbury School, his friends and former pupils created a fund with the intention of founding a chair in Latin to be named after him. Kennedy himself added £500 to the fund on the condition that the chair not be named after him. The professorship was thus created in 1869. In 1911, after Kennedy's death, the professorship was in fact renamed after him, with the consent of his family.

Kennedy Professors
 Hugh Andrew Johnstone Munro (1869–1872)
 John Eyton Bickersteth Mayor (1872–1911)
 Alfred Edward Housman (1911–1936)
 William Blair Anderson (1936–1942)
 Roger Aubrey Baskerville Mynors (1944–1953)
 Charles Oscar Brink (1954–1974)
 Edward John Kenney (1974–1982)
 Michael David Reeve (1984–2006)
 Stephen Oakley (2007–)

References

 
Latin, Kennedy
Faculty of Classics, University of Cambridge
Latin language
1869 establishments in the United Kingdom
Latin, Kennedy, Cambridge
Latin, Kennedy, Cambridge